Mathilda Hodgkins-Byrne (born 1 October 1994) is a British rower. She won a gold medal in the double scull at the 2016 World Rowing U23 Championships. She won a bronze medal at the 2017 World Rowing Championships in Sarasota, Florida, as part of the quadruple sculls with Bethany Bryan, Jessica Leyden and Holly Nixon.

In 2020 she won her second Wingfield Sculls, her previous win was in 2015. In 2021, she won a European silver medal in the quadruple sculls in Varese, Italy.

References

External links

Mathilda Hodgkins-Byrne at British Rowing

Living people
1994 births
British female rowers
World Rowing Championships medalists for Great Britain
European Rowing Championships medalists
Olympic rowers of Great Britain
Rowers at the 2020 Summer Olympics